Bagatelka refers to the following places in Poland:

 Bagatelka, Greater Poland Voivodeship
 Bagatelka, Łódź Voivodeship